Lo Hesse (born 6 August 1889 Berlin, died 1983?) was a German dancer.

Biography
She was the dancing partner of Joachim von Seewitz and was employed at the Staatsoper Berlin. In 1919 she refused a commitment at the Vienna State Opera and went on tour to South America.

Her biographical legacy is kept in the German Dance Archive Cologne.

She also worked as an actress and a model for  Ernst Stern.

References

1889 births
1980s deaths
Year of death uncertain
Dancers from Berlin
20th-century dancers
German actresses
20th-century German actresses